Prairie Mountain Media is an American publishing company owned by Digital First Media. It owns a series of newspapers, most noteworthy The Denver Post. Former half owner Scripps left the partnership in 2009.

It acquired Lehman Communications in 2011. It acquired the Greeley Tribune from Swift Communications in 2020

Prairie Mountain Media newspapers
The company owns the following newspapers in Colorado:

 Akron News-Reporter (Akron, Colorado)
 Broomfield Enterprise (Broomfield, Colorado)
 Brush News-Tribune (Brush, Colorado)
 Burlington Record (Burlington, Colorado)
 Cañon City Daily Record (Cañon City, Colorado)
 Colorado Daily (Boulder, Colorado)
 Colorado Hometown Weekly (Erie/Lafayette/Louisville/Superior, Colorado)
 Daily Camera (Boulder, Colorado)
 Denver Post (Denver, Colorado)
 Estes Park Trail-Gazette (Estes Park, Colorado)
 The Fort Morgan Times (Fort Morgan, Colorado)
 Greeley Tribune (Greeley, Colorado)
 Journal-Advocate (Sterling, Colorado)
 Julesburg Advocate (Julesburg, Colorado)
 Lamar Ledger (Lamar, Colorado)
 Longmont Times-Call (Longmont, Colorado)
 Loveland Reporter-Herald (Loveland, Colorado)

References

External links
 Scripps, MediaNews Group establish new partnership in Eastern Colorado -  source Scripps Press Release Friday, February 2, 2006
 Scripps, MediaNews form new partnership -  source

Newspaper companies of the United States
Digital First Media
Companies based in Boulder, Colorado
Publishing companies established in 2006
American companies established in 2006
Former E. W. Scripps Company subsidiaries
MediaNews Group